Talfazat is an Arabic IPTV network, streaming 19 live Arabic TV channels and On-Demand Arabic videos including news, entertainment, music and sports channels

Many of the on Demand shows are recorded series that are premiered during Arabic TV’s Prime season of Ramadan
 
Users who are registered with Talfazat can watch programs on the proprietary player on the website or on their Televisions. 
The same content can be accessed on a television through a top set box that is connected to the public internet. 
Both of these processes can be referred to as IPTV
 
Talfazat is powered by Neulion IPTV technology.

Channels Offered 
  (As of February 22, 2012)

 2MTV		
 Abu Dhabi Emirates	
 Abu Dhabi Sports		 	
 Addounia TV		
 Al Alam		
 Al Alan		
 Al Baghdadia		
 Al Diyar			 	
 Al Rai TV	 	 			
 Arab Woman Channel	 		 		 	 	
 Future TV	 	 	
 Hannibal			 	
 Infinity	
 Mehwar	
 OTV	 	 	
 Palestine TV	
 Sama Dubai		
 Sudan TV		
 Tele Liban

Availability 
Currently Talfazat is available in the U.S. and Canada.

Legality 
Talfazat is a legitimately legal service which pays for the rights to broadcast its channels.

Sources 
Official Website
IPTV technology
Arabic-language television stations